David Roche, 7th Viscount Fermoy (1573–1635) was an Irish magnate, soldier, and politician.

Birth and origins 
David was born about 1573, probably in Castletownroche, County Cork, Ireland. He was the only surviving son of Maurice Roche and his first wife, Eleanor FitzGerald. His father was the 6th Viscount Fermoy (also counted as the 1st). His father's family, the Roches were Old English and descended from Adam de Rupe who had come to Ireland from Wales with Robert FitzStephen.

His mother was a daughter of Sir Maurice FitzJohn FitzGerald of Totane, younger brother of James FitzJohn FitzGerald, 13th Earl of Desmond and third son of the de facto 12th Earl of Desmond. She also was a sister of James FitzMaurice FitzGerald, the "archtraitor", who led the first Desmond Rebellion. Her family were the FitzGeralds of Desmond, a cadet branch of the Old English Geraldines, whose senior branch were the FitzGeralds of Kildare.

Early life and Desmond Rebellions 

Despite these family relations, his father and grandfather fought against the insurgents in the Desmond Rebellions during which two of his paternal uncles were killed. His father succeeded his grandfather as the 6th Viscount Fermoy in 1581 or 1582. David was about ten in 1583 when the Desmond Rebellions ended with the killing of Gerald FitzGerald, the rebel earl.

His mother was still alive in 1590, but she predeceased his father, who remarried to Catherine FitzGerald, third daughter of the rebel earl by his second wife, Eleanor Butler.

Marriage and children 

Before 1593 Roche married Joan, daughter of James de Barry, 4th Viscount Buttevant, by his wife Ellen MacCarthy Reagh. His wife's family, the de Barrys, were Old English like his own and descended from Philip de Barry, who had come to Ireland from Wales in 1183.

David and Joan had five sons:
Maurice (1593–1670), who succeeded as the 8th Viscount Fermoy
John, deaf and dumb, died unmarried
Theobald, married Julia, daughter of Dominick Sarsfield, 1st Viscount Sarsfield, but had no issue
Ulick, married Gyles (Cecilia) daughter of John O'Conor Kerry, of Carrigfoyll, County Kerry
Redmond, accompanied St. Leger to Waterford in 1641 to submit the insurgents.

—and four daughters:
Ellen, who married first Donal MacCarthy Reagh of Kilbrittain, secondly Charles MacCarthy, 1st Viscount Muskerry, and thirdly Thomas Fitzmaurice, 4th son of Thomas Fitzmaurice, 18th Baron Kerry.
Elinor
Joan
Amy, married John Everard of Fethard, County Tipperary, as his second wife.

7th Viscount 

Roche succeeded his father as the 7th Viscount Fermoy on 24 October 1600. He is also counted as 2nd Viscount.

Proclamation of James I 

Queen Elizabeth I died on 24 March 1603. Charles Blount, 8th Baron Mountjoy, her Lord Deputy of Ireland, proclaimed James VI and I as King. Several Irish towns, dominated by Old English families delayed the proclamation still hoping for a Catholic succession. This was the case of Cork. On 11 April Mountjoy sent Captain Morgan to Cork to proclaim James. Thornton and Fermoy, as he now was, proclaimed James I as King on 13 April 1603, outside the walls in the northern suburbs when the mayor, Thomas Sarsfield, hesitated to do so.

House of Lords 

Fermoy sat in the House of Lords of the Irish Parliament 1613–1615, the only Irish Parliament of James I. He coordinated the opposition to the electoral abuses of James I, together with Jenico Preston, 5th Viscount Gormanston

The Irish Parliament of 1634–1635 was opened on 14 July 1634 by the new Lord Deputy of Ireland, Thomas Wentworth (later to become Lord Strafford), who had taken up office in July 1633. Lord Fermoy, an old man, sat by proxy in the House of Lords of the Parliament 1634–1635.

Death and timeline 

Fermoy died on 22 March 1635 at Castlerochetown and was buried at Bridgetown Abbey. He was succeeded by his son Maurice as the 8th Viscount (also counted as the 3rd).

Notes, citations, and sources

Notes

Citations

Sources 

  (for MacCarty and Roche)
  – D to F (for Fermoy)
  – S to T (for Thomond)
  – Canonteign to Cutts (for Clancarty)
  – Dacre to Dysart (for Desmond)
  – Eardley of Spalding to Goojerat (for Fermoy)
 
 
 
  – (for timeline)
 
 
  – 1603 to 1860
  – 1634 to 1699
 
 
 
  – Normans, English, Huguenots etc. (for Everard)
 
  – History
 

1570s births
1635 deaths
Normans in Ireland
Viscounts in the Peerage of Ireland